Ponmudipuzhayorathu is a 2005 Indian Malayalam-language film directed by Johnson Esthappan, starring Sheela, Nedumudi Venu, Kalabhavan Mani, Madhu Warrier, Mala Aravindan and Indrans.

Plot 
Bhaskaran is in love with Snehalatha and wishes to marry her. Snehalatha's father poses a condition in front of him and Bhaskaran has to complete the challenge to marry Snehalatha.

Cast 

Sheela ...  Subhadra
Nedumudi Venu ...  Muthappan
Kalabhavan Mani ...  Policeman
Madhu Warrier ...  Kumaran
Aravind Akash ...  Chandran
Meenakshi ...  Valsala
Suja Karthika ...  Radhika
Mala Aravindan ...  Thankappan
Vishnu ...  Rasheed
Bindu Panikkar ...  Bharathi
Indrans ...  Supran

Soundtrack 

"Maankutti Mainakkutti" - Manjari, Ilayaraja, Asha Menon, Vidhu Prathap
"Naadaswaram ketto" - Asha Menon, Bhavatharani
"Oru Chiri Kandaal" - Manjari, Vijay Yesudas
"Ammayenna vaakku"	- Ranjini Jose
"Vazhimaaroo vazhimaaroo" - 	Manjari, Asha Menon, Vidhu Prathap, Vijay Yesudas
"Pandathe Naattinpuram " - Ilaiyaraaja
"Ammayenna Vaakku (Male)" - KJ Yesudas

Future 
Esthappan was to collaborate with Ilayaraja and Kalabhavan Mani again in Daffedar.

References

External links 
 

2005 films
2000s Malayalam-language films
Films scored by Ilaiyaraaja